Lunatics at Large is a New Music chamber ensemble based in New York City. It was formed in 2007 to explore the repertoire for mixed chamber combinations beginning with Arnold Schoenberg's Pierrot lunaire, op. 21. Lunatics at Large is a Pierrot ensemble augmented with soprano and viola.

Mission 

A large mixed ensemble combining voice, strings, winds and piano, Lunatics at Large was formed to explore the timbral possibilities of chamber music repertoire from the beginning of the 20th century until now. In thematic concerts, the group's programs juxtapose standard repertoire and chamber pieces from established composers of the 20th century with more recent works. By doing so, Lunatics at Large encourages listeners to hear connections between different works and appreciate very recent compositions in the perspective of the evolution of classical music over the last 110 years. Lunatics at Large is committed to working closely with living composers and to commissioning new pieces for its expanded Pierrot instrumentation. The group also embraces collaborative projects with artists from other art forms and will organize several interdisciplinary performances involving poets, living composers and visual artists in upcoming seasons.

History 

Formed in 2007 at Mannes College The New School for Music, Lunatics at Large spent the first year of its existence exploring Arnold Schoenberg’s masterpiece Pierrot lunaire, op. 21, which the group performed 6 times in concerts.

With a first series of thematic concerts, Pierrot lunaire, et al., Lunatics at Large sought to broaden its look at how the previously unprecedented chamber combination of strings, winds and piano has changed the timbral possibilities open to composers throughout the 20th and 21st centuries. This program, which included premieres of Éric Gaudibert and Peter Kelsh, was performed at Mannes College The New School for Music, the Tenri Cultural Institute and Symphony Space in New York City. The latter performance was hailed by senior New York Times critic Allan Kozinn as "an assured, rich-hued account ... the players are young, energetic, and highly polished."

Since 2008, Lunatics at Large has broadened its repertoire to include works from the later 20th and from the 21st centuries. The second series of thematic concerts, The Natural World, currently being performed during the 2009–2010 season, features mostly living composers from the US and abroad. In preparation for the first concert of this series, the group worked closely with composers Ryan Brown, William Funk and Samuel Vriezen and gave the World Premiere of Samuel Vriezen's Sept germes cristallins.

In the spring of 2010, the group has been invited to perform at the Ear Heart Music series at the Tank and at the Music of Our Time series at WMP Concert Hall in New York City. Lunatics at Large has explored the connections between George Perle’s Sonata a Quattro and young composer André Brégégère’s Vol de nuit inspired by Perle’s work in a thematic concert entitled Light/Dark. In June 2010, Lunatics at Large has performed works of Fred Tillis and Raoul Pleskow at the American Composers Alliance Festival at Symphony Space.

In the spring of 2011, the group performed their Boston debut featuring the Boston premiere of Mohammed Fairouz's Unwritten.

The Sanctuary Project 

Lunatics at Large commissioned an exciting selection of established and emerging poets and composers to write works on the theme "Sanctuary" and collaborate to explore this theme in words and sounds. The opening performance of the Sanctuary Project - featuring five 10-15 minute chamber works and ten poems - was to take place at Weill Recital Hall at Carnegie Hall on March 21, 2011. Several other performances were to take place in actual sanctuaries of churches and synagogues in New York City.

Participating composers: 
Andre Bregegere
Mohammed Fairouz
Raphael Fusco
Laura Koplewitz
Alex Shapiro

Participating poets:
Robert Buchert
Joanna Fuhrman
David Shapiro
Yerra Sugarman
Ryan Vine

Group members 
Katharine Dain, soprano
Jonathan Engle, flute 
Ben Ringer, clarinet
Arthur Moeller, violin
Jen Herman, viola
Andrea Lee, cello
Evi Jundt, piano

References 
Lunatics at Large Website
Lunatics at Large New York Times review
Lunatics at Large profile on Fractured Atlas 
Katharine Dain
Mannes College The New School for Music
Samuel Vriezen
Ryan Brown
William Funk

Artists participating in the Sanctuary Project:
http://abregegere.com/
http://www.mohammedfairouz.com/
http://www.raphaelfusco.com/
http://www.laurakoplewitz.com/
http://www.alexshapiro.org/

See also
Eric Gaudibert

Chamber music groups
Musical groups from New York City
Musical groups established in 2007
2007 establishments in New York City